is a railway station in the city of Shiroishi, Miyagi Prefecture, Japan, operated by East Japan Railway Company (JR East).

Lines

Station layout
The station has one side platform and one island platform connected to the station building by a footbridge. The station is unattended.

Platforms

History
Kosugō Station opened on January 12, 1891. A new station building was completed in March 1985. The station was absorbed into the JR East network upon the privatization of the Japanese National Railways (JNR) on April 1, 1987.

Surrounding area

See also
 List of Railway Stations in Japan

External links

  

Railway stations in Miyagi Prefecture
Tōhoku Main Line
Railway stations in Japan opened in 1891
Shiroishi, Miyagi